Dime or Dimes may refer to:

Coins
 Dime (United States coin)
 Dime (Canadian coin)

Acronyms (DIME)
 Dark Internet Mail Environment
 Dense inert metal explosive
 Detroit Institute of Music Education
 DIME Denver, a branch of the Detroit Institute of Music Education
 DIME (Diplomacy, Information, Military, and Economic) — concept of instruments of national power
 Direct Internet Message Encapsulation
 Distributed Internet Measurements & Simulations, DIMES
 Dropping In Microgravity Environment
 Dual Independent Map Encoding

Banks
 Dime Community Bank, in Brooklyn, New York
 Dime Bank Building, Scranton, Pennsylvania
 Dime Savings and Trust Company, a historic bank building in Allenstown, Pennsylvania
 Dime Savings Bank (disambiguation), various banks

Music
 The Dimes, an American musical group
 Dime (album), an album by Guardian
 "Dime" (Beth song)
 "Dime" (Ivy Queen song)
 "Dime" (Pitbull song), a song by Pitbull featuring Ken-Y
 "Dime", a 1978 song by Rubén Blades and Willie Colón from Siembra
 "Dime", a 1985 song by Timbiriche from Timbiriche Rock Show
 "Dime", a 1990 song by Jerry Rivera from Abriendo Puertas

Places
 Dime Box, Texas, an unincorporated community in Lee County

Sports
 Dime defense, an American football defensive scheme
 Dime Magazine, an American basketball magazine

People
Surname
 James Dime (1897–1981), Yugoslavian-American professional boxer and actor
 Albert Dimes (1914–1972), Scottish-born London criminal

Given name
 Dime Jankulovski (born 1977), Swedish former football goalkeeper of Macedonian descent
 Dime Spasov (born 1985), Macedonian politician
 Dime Tasovski (born 1980), Macedonian professional basketball player

Nickname
 Dimebag Darrell (born Darrell Lance Abbott, 1966–2004), American heavy metal guitarist

See also
 Dime bar, a chocolate bar
 Dime language, the language of the Dime people of Ethiopia
 Dime museum, institutions that were popular at the end of the 19th century in the United States
 Dime novel, a type of popular fiction
 Dime Western, Western-themed dime novels, which spanned the era of the 1860s–1900s
 Dime Store (Portland, Oregon), a short-lived restaurant in Portland, Oregon
 Dime Tabernacle, a Seventh-day Adventist church in Battle Creek, Michigan